Vision Source is an optometric service network of independent optometrists headquartered in Kingwood, Houston, Texas, US. The company was founded by Glenn Ellisor, O.D. in 1991.

Vision Source is considered a franchisor in accordance to franchise law, and its members are franchisees, who own their respective practice. In 2015, Vision Source members reported a combined $2,511,500,000 in retail sales, professional services, and managed vision benefits, making them the second largest optical retailer in the U.S. for 2015, behind Luxottica.

Optometrists pay Vision Source a fee based on the percentage of the practice's gross income. In exchange, Vision Source provides optometrists access to new technologies, practice management tools, marketing assistance, and supply chain programs.

Brazos Equity Partners LLC invested in Vision Source in 2011 to support the company's growth.

In 2015, the U.S. subsidiary of Essilor International acquired Vision Source from Brazos Equity Partners LLC for an undisclosed amount.

References

External links

Essilor
Eyewear retailers of the United States
American companies established in 1991
Retail companies established in 1991
Eyewear companies of the United States
Companies based in Houston